Pattaya Kelappanum Pandiya is a 2014 Tamil language romantic comedy film directed by S. P. Rajkumar and produced by M. Ani Muthu. It stars Vidharth, Manisha Yadav, and Soori in the lead roles. The music was composed by Aruldev with cinematography by S. S. Murthy and editing by K. Thanigachalam. The film released on 5 September 2014.

Plot
The plot revolves around a minibus driver named Velpandiyan (Vidharth) and a conductor named Muthupandi (Soori) and how romance evolves with Kanmani (Manisha Yadav) on the bus.

Cast

Vidharth as Velpandiyan
Manisha Yadav as Kanmani
Soori as Muthupandi
Kovai Sarala as Velpandiyan and Muthupandi's mother
Ilavarasu as Velpandiyan and Muthupandi's father
Imman Annachi as Bus Owner
Vijay Anand as Saravanan
 Mohana as Kanmani's friend
Muthukaalai as Krish
T. P. Gajendran as Doctor
Lollu Sabha Manohar as Hospital Attender
Kottachi as passenger ridiculing bus driver
Halwa Vasu
Jayaprakash (cameo appearance)
Sangili Murugan (cameo appearance)

Soundtrack
The music was composed by Aruldev, who earlier composed for a film called Potta Potti.
 "Yen Vizhunthai" – Swetha Mohan, Abhay Jodhpurkar
 "Urula Urulakizhangu" - Tippu
 "Sollamale" - Vijay Prakash
 "Seerivarum" - Velmurugan, Mukesh Mohamed
 "Nachu Nachu" - Ranjith, Priya Himesh

Release
The satellite rights of the film were sold to Raj TV.

Critical reception
The Times of India gave the film 1.5 stars out of 5 and wrote, "Pattaya Kelappanum Pandiyaa is very much a film from the 1990s. The problem is that it hews closer to the dreary ones from the decade. It is the kind of film that stops for the director to utter a punchline to a joke before displaying his name in the credit". The New Indian Express wrote, "The narration could have been crisper towards the latter part. Pattaya... may not have the best of screenplays, but it’s a fairly watchable and a clean wholesome family entertainer thanks to  humour quotient". Onlykollywood wrote: "Pattaiya Kelapanum Paandiya is just another Tamil film which glorifies barbaric stalking in the first half and renders an atrocious justification in the second half. The only saving grace in the film is its occasional situational comedies appearing out of nowhere".

References

External links
 

2014 films
Indian comedy films
2010s Tamil-language films
Films directed by S. P. Rajkumar
2014 comedy films